Luka Đorđević (born 12 May 1991 in Belgrade) is a Serbian-born  Azerbaijani rower.

He won a gold medal at the 2011 World Rowing U23 Championships  in Men's Coxed fours and posted U23 world record. He repeated the success in 2012.

Since 2013 he competes for Azerbaijan. In the past, he rowed for the Serbian National team from 2007 to 2011.

References

1991 births
Living people
Serbian male rowers
Azerbaijani male rowers
Sportspeople from Belgrade